Edwin Hill may refer to:

 Edwin Hill (engineer) (1793–1876), British inventor (of envelope manufacturing machine), Controller of Stamps
 Edwin Hill-Trevor, 1st Baron Trevor (1819–1894), styled as Lord Edwin Hill until 1862
 Edwin A. Hill (active 1900), American inventor of the Hill system for writing chemical formulae
 Edwin J. Hill (1894–1941), U.S. Navy sailor posthumously awarded the Medal of Honor
 Edwin D. Hill (born 1937), American president of the International Brotherhood of Electrical Workers
 Edwin Escobar Hill (born 1969), Guatemalan politician

See also 
 Ed Hill (disambiguation)
 Edwin St Hill (1904–1957), Trinidadian cricketer
 Hill (surname)